Paavo, A Life in Five Courses (2010) is a Finnish-American documentary film directed, produced and written by Hanna Hemilä. Shot in New York City, Finland and Sweden, the documentary follows the life of internationally acclaimed chef and event planner Paavo Turtiainen.

Synopsis
Finnish farm boy Paavo Turtiainen is hired into the Parisian household of Swedish theatre producer Lars Schmidt and his wife, actress Ingrid Bergman. The couple “adopt” and train Paavo to navigate among the rich and famous. Encouraged by Schmidt, Paavo moves to New York and becomes an acclaimed chef and event planner for high society. Along the way, Paavo learns to stand on his own feet.
In the film Ingrid Bergman's daughters Isabella Rossellini and Pia Lindström talk about their “brother” and Lars Schmidt's son Kristian describes how it was growing up with Paavo.
In contrast to hectic New York, we spend time in the relaxing Swedish archipelago, watch Paavo pick mushrooms in the Finnish forests and visit the railway station in the tiny Finnish town of Karis, where Paavo first encountered Ingrid Bergman – on a magazine cover.

External links
 'Paavo, a Life in Five Courses' Website
 

Finnish documentary films
American documentary films
2010 films
Swedish-language films
2010 documentary films
Documentary films about food and drink
Films about chefs
2010s English-language films
2010s American films